Catherine Beaudry is a Canadian social scientist, currently a Full Professor and Canada Research Chair at Polytechnique Montréal. She is an alumnus of the Global Young Academy from 2010 to 2014. She completed a Bachelor of Engineering degree in  electrical engineering with a specialization in satellite technology at Polytechnique Montréal followed by graduate and doctoral studies in economics at the University of Oxford as a Rhodes Scholar.

References

Year of birth missing (living people)
Living people
Academic staff of the Université de Montréal
Canadian social scientists